The Los Angeles Vanguard was a weekly newspaper established in 1976 and published in Los Angeles, California. Dave Lindorff was a founder and editor, along with journalists Woodrow "Tommy" Thompson, Dorothy Thompson, Ben Pleasants, Ron Ridenour, and Jim Horowitz. A number of the Vanguard founders had previously written for the Los Angeles Free Press.

While writing for the Vanguard, Lindorff was given the Grand Prize of the Los Angeles Press Club for his reporting as well as an award for Best Article in a Weekly.

According to Lindorff, the Vanguard was infiltrated by an undercover member of L.A.'s Public Disorder Intelligence Division (PDID) squad, under Daryl Gates. The lawsuit CAPA v. Gates, with the Coalition Against Police Abuse (CAPA) as one of two dozen or so plaintiffs, later sued the Los Angeles Police Department (LAPD) on First Amendment grounds, exposing unlawful harassment, surveillance, and infiltration of the progressive movement in Los Angeles by LAPD agents — and a link to a right-wing outfit called the Western Goals Foundation, which was assembling the collected spy dossiers and making them available to law enforcement nationwide and to the federal spy agencies that were feeling hamstrung by the post-Watergate reforms limiting such spying. The lawsuit against Gates and the LAPD proved successful. A police commission ordered the disbandment of the PDID, which took place in January 1983.

The Vanguard, meanwhile, published for 14 months before shutting down in the summer of 1977.

References

External links 
 The Los Angeles Vanguard Archive, Park Center for Independent Media

Alternative weekly newspapers published in the United States
Newspapers published in Greater Los Angeles
Publications established in 1976
Weekly newspapers published in California